Graciela Araujo (24 September 1930 – 3 May 2019) was an Argentine film and TV actor.

References
Araujo was born in La Plata. She was first heard on the radio during the 1950s and she moved to television thanks to Alberto Migré. She was a constant stage actress appearing regularly at the Teatro General San Martín.

She appeared in numerous dramas including as "Nell" in Samuel Beckett's Endgame. She played "Sister Ursula" in the María Luisa Bemberg's film, I, the Worst of All, in 1990. and three years later in the film A Wall of Silence (1993). In addition to dubbing the voice of Nuria Torray in Dar la cara, she participated in television series recognized as Her favorite comedy (1965) and Como vos y yo (1998).

Araujo was a member of the Argentine Actors Association for 66 years.

Death
Graciela Araujo died in Buenos Aires on 3 May 2019, aged 88, from undisclosed causes. She was cremated at the Chacarita Cemetery.

Filmografie

1962: Teleteatro Odol (TV Series 1962, 1 episode)
1963: Teleteatro Palmolive-Colgate del aire (TV Series, 1 episode)
1966: Carola y Carolina (TV Series 1966, 3 episodes)
1965-1970: Su comedia favorita (TV Series,  3 episodes)
1970: Gran teatro universal (TV Series, 1 episode)
1970: El teleteatro de Alberto Migré (TV Series)
1964-1971: Teleteatro Palmolive del aire (TV Series, 2 episodes)
1971: Teleteatro Palmolive del aire (TV Series 1971, 1 episode)
1973: Platea 7 (TV Series 1973, 1 episode)
1973: Cacho de la esquina (TV Series 1973, 19 episodes)
1974: El teatro de Jorge Salcedo (TV Series, 3 episodes)
1979-1981: Los especiales de ATC (TV Series, 2 episodes)
1981: El mundo del espectáculo (TV Series, 1 episode)
1990: I, the Worst of All
1990: Yo, la peor de todas
1992:  Soy Gina (TV Series, 19 episodes)
1992: Luces y sombras (TV Series, 19 episodes)
1992: Amores (TV Series 1992, 1 episode)
1993: A Wall of Silence
1993: Un muro de silencio
1971-1995: Alta comedia(TV Series, 6 episodes)
1996: Cartoon Family (TV Series)
1998: Como vos & yo (TV Series 1998, 99 episodes)
2012: El Tabarís, lleno de estrellas (TV Movie)

References

1930 births
2019 deaths
Actresses from Buenos Aires
Argentine film actresses
Argentine stage actresses
People from La Plata